Strasberg is a surname. Notable persons with this name include:

Susan Strasberg (1938–1999), American stage, film, and television actress, daughter of Lee and Paula
Lee Strasberg (1901–1982), Polish-born American actor, director, and theatre practitioner
John Strasberg (born 1941), American actor, director, teacher and writer, son of Lee and Paula, brother of Susan
Paula Strasberg (1909–1966), American stage actress, Lee Strasberg's second wife